Blessed may refer to:

 The state of having received a blessing
 Blessed, a title assigned by the Roman Catholic Church to someone who has been beatified

Film and television
 Blessed (2004 film), a 2004 motion picture about a supernatural pregnancy
 Blessed (2008 film), a 2008 British drama film about a man looking after a shipwrecked girl on a Scottish island
 Blessed (2009 film), a 2009 Australian drama film about the lives of seven youths on the streets of Melbourne
 Blessed (TV series), a 2005 BBC television sitcom about a record producer and his struggles bringing up children

Music

Albums
 Blessed (Beenie Man album), 1995
 Blessed (Flavour N'abania album), 2012
 Blessed (Hillsong album), 2002
 Blessed (Fady Maalouf album), 2008
 Blessed (Joe Maneri album), 1997
 Blessed (Lucinda Williams album), 2011

Songs
 "Blessed" (Avicii song), 2011
 "Blessed" (Daniel Caesar song), 2017
 "Blessed" (Elton John song), 1995
 "Blessed" (Fady Maalouf song), 2008
 "Blessed" (GloRilla song), 2022
 "Blessed" (Jill Scott song), 2012
 "Blessed" (Martina McBride song), 2002
 "Blessed" (Rachael Lampa song)
 "Blessed" (Schoolboy Q song), 2012
 "Blessed", a 1971 song by Lazarus on the album Lazarus
 "Blessed", a 1966 song by Simon and Garfunkel, from the album Sounds of Silence
 "Blessed", a 2021 song by Tyler, the Creator, from the album Call Me If You Get Lost

People
 The Blessed One, name used for Gautama Buddha
 Brian Blessed (born 1936), British actor

See also
 Blessed be (disambiguation)